Yasemin Çegerek (born 10 November 1977, in Apeldoorn) is a Dutch politician of Turkish descent.  She was an MP for the Labour Party (Partij van de Arbeid) between 18 June 2013 and 23 March 2017. She replaced Désirée Bonis, who left the House of Representatives on 13 June 2013. Çegerek was a member of the commissions of foreign affairs, defense, European affairs, Kingdom relations, foreign trade and development aid. Çegerek temporarily went on maternity leave and her designated replacement was Marith Rebel-Volp. However, as House of Representatives member Myrthe Hilkens left the House on 28 August 2013, Rebel-Volp permanently replaced her instead. Henk Leenders was named as the replacement for Çegerek.

Between 2002 and 2006 Çegerek served as a municipal councillor in Enschede. And since 2007 she has been a member of the States-Provincial of Gelderland. Çegerek studied public administration at the University of Twente.

ÇEgerek's time in the House ended on 23 March 2017. Since 22 May 2018 she has been alderman in Heerde.

References

1977 births
Living people
21st-century Dutch politicians
21st-century Dutch women politicians
Aldermen in Gelderland
Dutch people of Turkish descent
Labour Party (Netherlands) politicians
Members of the House of Representatives (Netherlands)
Members of the Provincial Council of Gelderland
Municipal councillors of Enschede
People from Apeldoorn
University of Twente alumni